was a  after Kōchō and before Kenji. This period spanned the years from February 1264 to April 1275.

Change of era
 1264 ; 1264: The new era name was created to mark an event or a number of events. The previous era ended and a new one commenced in Kōchō 4.

Events of the Bun'ei era
 March 6, 1274 (Bun'ei 11, 26th day of the 1st month): In the 15th year of Kameyama-tennōs reign (亀山天皇15年), the emperor abdicated; and the succession (senso) was received by his cousin.
 May 4, 1274 (Bun'ei 11, 26th day of the 3rd month):  Emperor Go-Uda is said to have acceded to the throne (sokui). The retired Emperor Kameyama continued to exercise power as cloistered emperor.

 November 19, 1274 (Bun'ei 11, 20th day of the 10th month): Battle of Bun'ei -- Kublai Khan's Mongol forces land at Hakata Bay near Fukuoka in Kyūshū. After landing and some armed skirmishes, the invaders withdraw to spend the night on shipboard. That night, a storm sinks several ships, and the fleet retreats to Korea rather than pressing their initial advantage. In the course of the day's fighting, the Hakozaki Shrine was burned to the ground. Nihon Ōdai Ichiran explains that the invaders were defeated because they lacked arrows.

See also
 Mongol invasions of Japan
 Battle of Kōan - the second invasion attempt by Kublai Khan, in 1281.

Notes

References
 Davis, Paul K. (1999).  100 Decisive Battles: From Ancient Times to the Present. Oxford: Oxford University Press. ; 
 Nussbaum, Louis-Frédéric and Käthe Roth. (2005).  Japan encyclopedia. Cambridge: Harvard University Press. ;  OCLC 58053128
 Titsingh, Isaac. (1834). Nihon Odai Ichiran; ou,  Annales des empereurs du Japon.  Paris: Royal Asiatic Society, Oriental Translation Fund of Great Britain and Ireland. 
 Turnbull, Stephen R. (2003).  Genghis Khan & the Mongol Conquests, 1190-1400. London: Routledge. ; ; 
 Varley, H. Paul. (1980). A Chronicle of Gods and Sovereigns: Jinnō Shōtōki of Kitabatake Chikafusa. New York: Columbia University Press. ;

External links
 National Diet Library, "The Japanese Calendar" -- historical overview plus illustrative images from library's collection

Japanese eras
1260s in Japan
1270s in Japan